The Huron School District is a public school district in Huron, South Dakota, United States. It contains four elementary schools, a middle school, a vocational school, a high school, two Hutterite colonies and an alternative high school. The school district owns and operated the local arena and the former Si Tanka University sports center. Huron School District is a member of the South Dakota High School Activities Association. It offers special education, Title I, and a large ESL program.

The voters in the Huron School District are voting on a $22.165 million bond issue to remodel and add to the current elementary school due to its limited space and poor conditions.

History
The Huron School District was founded in 1880 with 15 students in a converted store in downtown Huron. They stayed there until the first school buildings were ready to be used.
 The school district owns and operates the city arena, built in 1950 at a cost of $900,000 and renovated throughout the 2000s.
 Huron bought the Huron University Activities Center in 2008.
 The original football stadium stood from 1937-1974 and is now a residential section with street names including Quarterback Court and Gridiron Place.
 The current football stadium with full track and field was built in 1974.

The following is list of former and current schools operated by the district.

 Hamilton School, 1882-?
 First Jefferson, 1886-1927
 Second Jefferson, 1927–present
 First High School, 1904-1914, renovated 1919, 1937; served as the first junior high school; demolished 1999 
 Second High School, 1914-1967 demolished 1967
 Third High School, 1967–present; renovated 2009 office expanded and remodeled 2020
 McKinley, 1921-1998; added on in 1960; the 1998 demotion was on the 1921 building now the home to the local Head Start
 Middle School, 1999–present
 Madison School, 1956–present; remodeled/expanded in 1960, 2012, 2013
 Lincoln School, 1910-1975; razed to make way for Lincoln Square Apartments
 Huron Vocational School, built in 1977
 Washington School, 1954–present
 Buchanan School, 1961–present; expanded in 1970, 1996

Athletics
Huron high school team name is Huron Tigers. The school has athletic teams for boys' football, basketball, wrestling, track, cross-country, tennis, golf, and soccer. Teams for girls include volleyball, basketball, track, cross country, gymnastics, tennis, golf, competitive cheer and dance, and soccer

State Championships:
 Boys Basketball - 1917, 1927, 1930, 1936, 1937, 1945, 1958, 1973, 1981, 1993, 2004
 Girls Basketball - 1989
 Boys Cross country - 1983, 1989
 Girls Cross country - 1978, 1981, 1987, 1989
 Boys Football - 1992
 Boys Track - 1910, 1911, 1952
 Boys Wrestling - 1994
 Boys Golf - 1939, 1942, 1963, 1974
 Girls Volleyball - 1998, 1999

Notable alumni

 Gladys Pyle - United States Senator, 1938–1939. First woman ever elected United States Senator from South Dakota was born in Huron on October 4, 1890.
 Cheryl Ladd - actress and singer, Charlie's Angels. Born Cheryl Jean Stoppelmoor in Huron, SD on July 12, 1951.

References

External links
 Huron School District's official website

School districts in South Dakota
Huron, South Dakota
School districts established in 1886
Education in Beadle County, South Dakota
1886 establishments in Dakota Territory